Claire Purdy (born 1 April 1980) is an English female rugby union player. She represented  at the 2010 Women's Rugby World Cup. She was also named in the squad to the 2014 Women's Rugby World Cup.

References

External links
Player Profile

1980 births
Living people
England women's international rugby union players
English female rugby union players
Female rugby union players
Place of birth missing (living people)
21st-century English women